Brasília Open is a beach volleyball event that is part of the Swatch FIVB World Tour. It happens annually in Brasília, Brazil.

2011 Tournament

Gold medal Match (Men)

References

FIVB Beach Volleyball World Tour
International sports competitions in Brasília